Thompson Middle School may refer to one of these schools:
 Thompson Middle School (Alabama) in Alabaster, Alabama
 Thompson Middle School (New Jersey) in Middletown Township, New Jersey
 Harry B. Thompson Middle School in Syosset, New York
 Willie Thompson Middle School in Saginaw, Michigan